The 1999 NCAA Division I Field Hockey Championship was the 19th women's collegiate field hockey tournament organized by the National Collegiate Athletic Association, to determine the top college field hockey team in the United States. The Maryland Terrapins won their third championship, defeating the Michigan Wolverines in the final. The semifinals and championship were hosted by Northeastern University at Parsons Field in Brookline, Massachusetts. This was the first tournament to feature 16 teams; this format was maintained until 2013 when 19 teams competed.

Bracket

References 

1999
Field Hockey
1999 in women's field hockey
1999 in sports in Massachusetts
Women's sports in Massachusetts